George Henry Streets (5 April 1893 – 1958) was an English footballer who played in the Football League for Notts County and The Wednesday.

References

1893 births
1958 deaths
English footballers
Association football goalkeepers
English Football League players
Raleigh Athletic F.C. players
Sheffield Wednesday F.C. players
Notts County F.C. players
Boston Town F.C. (1920s) players
Newark Town F.C. players